Okemah Rising is the twelfth studio album by American band Dropkick Murphys and it will be released on May 12, 2023, on Dummy Luck Music. The album was recorded in 2022 during the band's recording sessions for This Machine Still Kills Fascists and like the songs from that album, the songs are composed of unused lyrics and words from Woody Guthrie. Like with the previous album, Okemah Rising does not feature vocalist Al Barr who was on hiatus from the band to take care of his ailing mother. The album was executive produced by Guthrie's daughter Nora Gutherie and also features appearances Violent Femmes, Jaime Wyatt, Jesse Ahern and Woody's grandson Cole Quest. The album features a reworked "Tulsa Version" of the band's biggest hit, "I'm Shipping Up to Boston", which was originally written by Guthrie.

Background
The album was recorded in Tulsa in Woody Guthrie's home state of Oklahoma at Leon Russell's The Church Studio. With Al Barr on hiatus from the band, the band thought it was the ideal time to record an acoustic album. The band released the first album from these recording sessions, This Machine Still Kills Fascists, in 2022.

Promotion
The album was preceded by the first single and music video for "I Know How it Feels" on March 1, 2023.

The band's early 2023 dates in Europe featured the first performances of songs from Okemah Rising. The band will continue to promote the album throughout their annual St. Patricks Day shows in the U.S. which begin in March 2023. 

For people who preorder the vinyl version of Okemah Rising through the band's website, they will receive a free limited edition 7-inch vinyl featuring acoustic versions of "Barroom Hero" and "Skinhead on the MBTA" recorded live at the Ryman Auditorium in Nashville. The 7-inch will not be sold at retail.

Track listing

Personnel
Dropkick Murphys
Tim Brennan – guitar, vocals
Ken Casey – lead vocals
Jeff DaRosa – banjo, mandolin, acoustic guitars, vocals
Matt Kelly – drums, percussion, vocals
James Lynch – guitars, vocals

Additional musicians
Cole Quest – dobro guitar, backing vocals

References

2023 albums
Dropkick Murphys albums